Shankar Nagar is a residential area located in Rangareddy district, Telangana. It is divided into colonies like New Shankar Nagar, Sri Shankar Nagar. It was named after a person called Shankar. It comes under GHMC. It is bordered by Ashok Nagar, Bhavanipuram, Kakatiya Nagar and Sai Colony.

Transportation
It is adjacent to Ashok Nagar, which is located on the Mumbai Highway. The nearest bus station is in Ashok Nagar. Nearest railway stations are Chanda Nagar and Seri Lingampally. The nearest airports are Begumpet Airport and RGIA in Shamshabad, Hyderabad. Ola and Uber Taxi services are available in the area, and auto rickshaws can be availed from Ashok Nagar

Places to Visit
Beeramguda Gutta,
Vinayaka Swamy Temple,
Kakaktiya Nagar Ramalayam.

Nearest Towns
Chanda Nagar, Seri Lingampally, Miyapur, Patancheru, Gachibowli are the nearest localities from Shankar Nagar.

References

Cities and towns in Ranga Reddy district